Hakob Pilosyan (born 7 July 1973 in Gyumri) is an Armenian weightlifter.

Pilosyan qualified to compete at the 2000 Summer Olympics, but didn't due to illness.

References

External links
 Hakob Pilosyan at Lift Up
 
 

1973 births
Living people
Sportspeople from Gyumri
Armenian male weightlifters
European Weightlifting Championships medalists
21st-century Armenian people